The eighth season of The Bachelorette, an ABC reality television series, premiered on May 14, 2012. This season features 26-year-old Emily Maynard, a single mother from West Virginia living in Charlotte, North Carolina. 

Maynard was previously the winner of season 15 of The Bachelor, where she got engaged to Brad Womack; however, they ended their engagement in May 2011.

The season concluded on July 22, 2012, with Maynard accepting a proposal from 27-year-old entrepreneur Jef Holm. They ended their engagement in October 2012. 

This is the first season of The Bachelorette filmed in Maynard's current city of Charlotte, North Carolina, where she and her daughter Ricki Hendrick live (along with the child's paternal grandfather;  the child's father died before she was born). This marks the first time a show in The Bachelor franchise has taken place in the Southern United States and also the second time one has been filmed on the East Coast since New York City in season three.

Production

Casting and contestants
On January 18, 2012, Maynard was announced as the next Bachelorette.

Notable contestants including race car driver Arie Luyendyk Jr.; former college football player Sean Lowe; and singer-songwriter David Homyk.

Michael Nance died on May 29, 2017. The official cause of his death was multiple drug toxicity, according to the Travis County Office of the Medical Examiner. His death was ruled as accidental.

Contestants

On May 1, 2012, 25 contestants were revealed. Biographical information according to ABC official series site, which gives first names only, plus footnoted additions. Ages stated are at time of contest.

Future appearances

The Bachelor
Sean Lowe was chosen as the lead of the seventeenth season of The Bachelor. Arie Luyendyk Jr. was chosen as the lead of the twenty-second season of The Bachelor.

Bachelor Pad
Chris Bukowski, Kalon McMahon, and Tony Pieper returned for the third season of Bachelor Pad. McMahon and his partner, Lindzi Cox, were eliminated during week 6, finishing in 5th place. Pieper and his partner, Blakeley Jones, were eliminated at the beginning of week 7, finishing in 4th place. Bukowski and his partner, Sarah Newlon, finished as the runners-up.

The Bachelorette
Bukowski returned for the tenth season of The Bachelorette during night one. However, Bachelorette Andi Dorfman decided she didn't want to meet him.

Bachelor in Paradise
Season 1

Bukowski and McMahon returned for the first season of Bachelor in Paradise. Bukowski quit the show during week 3. McMahon was eliminated during week 4. 

Season 2

Bukowski returned for the second season of Bachelor in Paradise, but quit the show during week 4. 

Season 6

Bukowski returned once again for the sixth season of Bachelor in Paradise and left engaged to Katie Morton.

Other appearances
Outside of the Bachelor Nation franchise, Lowe competed in the sixteenth season of Dancing with the Stars. He was partnered with Peta Murgatroyd and finished in 6th place.

Additionally, Luyendyk, Jean-Paul LaCount and Alejandro Velez appeared as a contestants in the Bachelors vs. Bachelorettes special on the season 7 of Wipeout.

Call-out order

 The contestant received the first impression rose
 The contestant received a rose during a date
 The contestant was eliminated
 The contestant was eliminated during a date
 The contestant was eliminated outside the rose ceremony
 The contestant was part of non-elimination bottom two
 The contestant won the competition

Episodes

Post-show
On October 16, 2012, just months after their public engagement, the couple announced their breakup.

Emily married Tyler Johnson on June 7, 2014. In addition to her daughter with her late ex-fiance Joseph "Ricky" Hendrick, Josephine "Ricki" Riddick Hendrick (born June 29, 2005), Emily and Tyler have five children together, Jennings Tyler (born July 15, 2015), Gibson Kyle (born September 16, 2016), Gatlin Avery (born November 13, 2017), Magnolia Belle (born October 17, 2020), and Jones West (born August 31, 2022).

References

External links
 

2012 American television seasons
The Bachelorette (American TV series) seasons
Television shows filmed in North Carolina
Television shows filmed in West Virginia
Television shows filmed in Tennessee
Television shows filmed in Bermuda
Television shows filmed in England
Television shows filmed in Croatia
Television shows filmed in the Czech Republic
Television shows filmed in Illinois
Television shows filmed in Utah
Television shows filmed in Arizona
Television shows filmed in Texas
Television shows filmed in Los Angeles
Television shows filmed in Curaçao